Edon Amaral Neto (born 21 February 1967), commonly known as Edinho, is a Brazilian retired footballer who played as a striker.

Playing career
Born in Arapiraca, Alagoas, Edinho played for modest clubs in his homeland. In 1990, he moved to Portugal where he spent four seasons competing in both the second and third divisions, with S.C. Olhanense and Portimonense SC.

From 1994 to January 1997, Edinho played in the Primeira Liga, scoring 29 goals combined for G.D. Chaves and Vitória de Guimarães. On 6 February he signed with English Football League First Division side Bradford City, netting ten times in 41 games in his first full season with the Bantams.

On 23 March 1999, Edinho moved to Dunfermline Athletic on loan, scoring once against Hearts during his short spell. After leaving Bradford, he returned to Portugal and continued to play in the country until his retirement one decade later (at the age of 42), only two of his ten seasons being spent in the second tier, with C.F. União de Lamas and Olhanense – in 2007–08, he even helped historic Algarve team S.C. Farense promote from the regional championships; in the two major levels combined, he amassed totals of 188 matches and 59 goals.

Coaching career
As of June 2019 Edinho was coaching youth players at a Portuguese academy. That same month he played for the Bradford City veteran's team at a friendly tournament in the Algarve.

Personal life
Edinho' son, Edinho Júnior, is also a footballer and a forward.

References

External links

1967 births
Living people
Brazilian footballers
Association football forwards
Avaí FC players
Primeira Liga players
Liga Portugal 2 players
Segunda Divisão players
S.C. Olhanense players
Portimonense S.C. players
G.D. Chaves players
Vitória S.C. players
C.F. União de Lamas players
F.C. Vizela players
Juventude Sport Clube players
S.C. Farense players
English Football League players
Bradford City A.F.C. players
Scottish Premier League players
Dunfermline Athletic F.C. players
Brazilian expatriate footballers
Expatriate footballers in Portugal
Expatriate footballers in England
Expatriate footballers in Scotland
Brazilian expatriate sportspeople in Portugal
Brazilian expatriate sportspeople in England
Brazilian football managers
S.C. Farense managers
Sportspeople from Alagoas